Kemar Donaldson popularly known as Kranium, is a Jamaican reggae and dancehall singer known for his 2013 hit single "Nobody Has To Know" which gave him an international recognition and led him to the Atlantic Records record label.

Personal life 
The nephew of Screwdriver, he was in Montego Bay before moving to Miami, Florida  in 2005. He moved to New York City one year later.

Career
His career began with a series of appearances in New York City and the tri-state area. He opened shows for Gyptian, Serani, I-Octane and Tarrus Riley.

His song, "Nobody Has to Know", produced by PLMR Productions, played on ethnic radio stations in New York City, including the influential Hot 97 FM. "Nobody Has To Know" sold more than 39,000 copies in 2015, peaking at #32 on the Reggae Digital Songs chart. Kranium has been working with producers including Tony Kelly, TJ Records and Cash Flow. 

Under Atlantic Records, he released his debut album Rumors in 2015, followed by Midnight Sparks in 2019.  He also released an EP titled Toxic in 2021, followed by the EP titled In Too Deep in 2022 under the label.

On March 2, 2023, Kranium announced that he parted ways with Atlantic Records.

Discography

Albums

 Rumors (2015)
Midnight Sparks (2019)

Singles

 "Nobody Has to Know" MC: Platinum
 We Can
 Between Us
 Lifestyle
 Draw Me Out
 History
 Beach House
 Stamina
 Lil Luv
 Moonlight
 Can't Give A...
 Swagga Buck
 Ride It
 Rumors
 Gotta Believe
 Spydog
 Rebel Moon
 This Morning
 El Obraje
 Dos Sonrisas, Una Lagrima
 Envuelto en el Silencio
 Interlude
 No Te Tortures
 Nobody Haffi Know
 Sleepless Nights
 Summer Chill
 Sex Addict
 What We Need
 Pressure Bust Pipe
 No Commoners
 Manos cruzadas
 Up and Away
 Sin Tener Más (ft. Timbaland and Cali)
 Want
 Yesos de Familia (with Wizkid, ft. Kyla, Ty Dolla $ign, Dandee and J Balvin)
 "Can't Believe"  (with Ty Dolla Sign, ft. WizKid) MC: Gold
Risky (Refix)  (with Davido 
 So Me Move
 Gal Policy (Remix) ft Tiwa Savage

References

1993 births
Living people
Jamaican reggae musicians
People from Montego Bay